Ellie Watton (born 10 June 1989) is a retired English international field hockey player who played as a forward for England and Great Britain. She made her first international appearance against South Africa on 4 February 2013. 
She retired  from international hockey after competing in the 2018 FIH World Cup in London and has now resumed her teaching career, taking up a position at Rugby School in August 2018. She continues to coach and inspire the next generation of young hockey players 

Since becoming a full-time athlete she played club hockey at St Albans, Holcombe & Beeston.

Watton grew up in Ashover, Derbyshire and was educated at Highfields School, Matlock and Repton School, Derbyshire. A qualified teacher, she taught and coached hockey at Oakham School until July 2014, and became a full-time athlete, based at Bisham Abbey. She is supported by the National Lottery Fund and sponsored by Osaka Hockey. She has competed for the England and Great Britain women's hockey teams, including the 2014 & 2018 World Cups, 2014 Commonwealth Games, 2014 Champions Trophy, 2015 World League Finals and was a member of the Rio 2016 Gold medal winning squad.

In the final year of her international career, she travelled to Brisbane to compete in the 2018 Commonwealth Games, returning with a Bronze Medal. Her last international appearance was for England in a home World Cup Quarter final - losing 2-0 to the eventual winners, Holland.

References

1989 births
Living people
Commonwealth Games silver medallists for England
English female field hockey players
Field hockey players at the 2014 Commonwealth Games
People educated at Repton School
Commonwealth Games medallists in field hockey
Sportspeople from Chesterfield, Derbyshire
Female field hockey forwards
Holcombe Hockey Club players
Beeston Hockey Club players
Women's England Hockey League players
Medallists at the 2014 Commonwealth Games